Shock Waves is a compilation album by Japanese heavy metal band Vow Wow. The album was released in 1986 in the USA and contains most of the songs from the Tony Platt-produced album III (1986), with the addition of "Beat of Metal Motion" and "You Know What I Mean" from the albums of 1984 and 1985 respectively.

Track listing 
Side one
 "Nightless City" - 4:55
 "Shot in the Dark" - 3:41
 "Running Wild" - 4:28
 "Signs of the Times" - 4:05
 "Go Insane" - 4:22

Side two
 "Beat of Metal Motion" - 4:46
 "Stay Close Tonight" - 4:29
 "Shock Waves" - 4:58
 "You Know What I Mean" - 4:10
 "Doncha Wanna Cum (Hangar 15)" - 3:32

Personnel
Kyoji Yamamoto - lead guitar, backing vocals
Genki Hitomi - vocals
Rei Atsumi - keyboards, backing vocals
Kenji Sano - bass guitar, backing vocals
Toshihiro Niimi - drums

References

Vow Wow albums
1986 compilation albums
Capitol Records compilation albums